Gray Hampton Miller (born December 9, 1948 in Houston, Texas) is a senior United States district judge of the United States District Court for the Southern District of Texas.

Education and career

Miller attended the United States Merchant Marine Academy from 1967 to 1969, but left without receiving a degree. He received a Bachelor of Arts degree in 1974 from the University of Houston and a Juris Doctor in 1978 from the University of Houston Law Center. He served as a police officer of the Houston Police Department from 1969 to 1978. Upon graduating from law school, he joined Houston's Fulbright & Jaworski law firm, where he later became partner in 1986. Miller remained at this law firm until his appointment to the district court.

District Court service

On January 25, 2006, Miller was nominated by President George W. Bush to be a United States District Judge for the United States District Court for the Southern District of Texas, in place of Judge Ewing Werlein, Jr., who had taken senior status in 2006. He was confirmed unanimously by the Senate on April 25, 2006 and received his commission the same day. He assumed senior status on December 9, 2018.

In February 2019, Gray Miller ruled in National Coalition for Men v. Selective Service System that the male-only military draft in the United States is unconstitutional because it violates the equal protection clause of the Fourteenth Amendment to the US Constitution. That decision was reversed by the 5th Circuit Court of Appeals. A petition for review was then filed with the U.S. Supreme Court. However, the Court declined to consider it on the basis that the situation was under active review by Congress.

References

External links

Court Website

1948 births
Living people
American police officers
Judges of the United States District Court for the Southern District of Texas
People from Houston
Strake Jesuit College Preparatory alumni
United States district court judges appointed by George W. Bush
21st-century American judges
University of Houston alumni
University of Houston Law Center alumni